Feather & Black is a British furniture retailer based in Surrey, England. It has eight stores throughout the United Kingdom, and also sells online.

History
The company was founded in 2004 by Robbie Feather and Adam Black. Later, it was bought by the Wade Group. In 2017, the Swedish manufacturer Hilding Anders acquired 17 of the 20 Feather & Black stores.

Awards
Feather & Black has won the Gold Standard at the Direct Commerce Awards in the Home including Food & Drink category. It won the House Beautiful Award in Best Furniture Range category. It was featured as the Best Luxury Topper Without The Price Tag by the Evening Standard.

References

British furniture makers
Companies based in Surrey
2004 establishments in the United Kingdom
Furniture retailers of the United Kingdom
Retail companies established in 2004